Michael E. Heisley (March 13, 1937 – April 26, 2014) was an American businessman and former majority owner of the Memphis Grizzlies. He orchestrated the move of the team from Vancouver in 2001, after promising to keep the franchise in Vancouver when he purchased it in 2000. He agreed in 2006 to sell his 70% controlling stake in the Grizzlies to a consortium including Christian Laettner and Brian Davis, but the group missed a deadline for the purchase and Heisley found no other bidder willing to meet the team's $300M asking price.

In 2012 Heisley decided to sell the Grizzlies and step aside from all of his corporate interests due to his advancing age. The team announced on June 11, 2012, that Ubiquiti Networks founder Robert J. Pera would be purchasing the team, but Heisley would remain on board until the sale was finalized. The sale was finalized on October 25, 2012, and the team is now a part of Memphis Basketball, LLC.

Heisley was also involved in multiple business ventures, such as: 
Heico Holding, Inc.
The Heico Companies, LLC 
Heico Acquisitions 
Stony Lane Partners 

A computer salesman by trade, he used $150,000 from selling his home and $10 million in bank loans to acquire Conco, maker of sewer and drain equipment. Later Heisley expanded his holdings through the purchase of several near-bankrupt Rust Belt manufacturers. As of 2009, Heico operates 40 companies, largely in steel, construction, and equipment.

He appeared several times on the Forbes rich list.

Personal life
Heisley, was born in Washington, D.C., grew up in Alexandria, Virginia, and had residences in Chicago, Illinois, and Jupiter Island, Florida. He was a graduate of Georgetown University,  and was married with five children.

He was instrumental in establishing and running the Heisley Family Foundation.

Heisley died on April 26, 2014, of complications of a stroke.   He was 77.

References

1937 births
2014 deaths
Philanthropists from Illinois
Georgetown University alumni
Memphis Grizzlies owners
Businesspeople from Alexandria, Virginia
People from Kane County, Illinois
People from Washington, D.C.
People from Jupiter Island, Florida
20th-century American businesspeople
20th-century American philanthropists